Nik Nazmi bin Nik Ahmad (born 12 January 1982) is a Malaysian politician from the People's Justice Party (PKR), a component party of presently the Pakatan Harapan (PH) and formerly Pakatan Rakyat (PR) coalition who has served as Minister of Natural Resources, Environment and Climate Change in the Pakatan Harapan (PH) administration under Prime Minister Anwar Ibrahim since December 2022 and the Member of Parliament (MP) for Setiawangsa since May 2018. He served as Member of the Selangor State Executive Council (EXCO) in the PR and PH state administrations under former Menteri Besar Azmin Ali from September 2014 to May 2018, Deputy Speaker of the Selangor State Legislative Assembly from June 2013 to September 2014, Member of the Selangor State Legislative Assembly (MLA) for Seri Setia from March 2008 to May 2018, Chair of the Defence and Home Affairs Select Committee from December 2019 to March 2020 and Political Secretary to the Menteri Besar of Selangor from March 2008 to June 2010.  He has also served as Vice President of PKR since July 2022, 3rd Youth Chief of PKR from August 2014 to November 2018, Communications Director of PKR from August 2010 to September 2013, 1st Youth Chief of PH from October 2017 to December 2018 and State Youth Chief of PKR of Selangor.

Early life 

Nik Nazmi Nik Ahmad was born in Kuala Lumpur on 12 January 1982 and his parents were originally from Kota Bharu, Kelantan. He grew up in Petaling Jaya, Selangor.

He was selected to attend the Malay College Kuala Kangsar. In 2000, he received a Permodalan Nasional Berhad scholarship to do his A-Levels in Kolej Yayasan UEM, where he was elected as Student Council President.

Nik Nazmi later furthered his studies at King's College London to read law. He was active in various student bodies including UKEC, Federation of Student Islamic Societies and Labour Students. He was elected as a delegate for King's College to the National Union of Students (United Kingdom) Conference in 2005.

He served his sponsors PNB for less than a year, and joined PKR leader Anwar Ibrahim's office in 2006. He paid back his sponsors by taking a mortgage on a family property.

Political career 
After serving as an assistant to Anwar Ibrahim, he was nominated by Parti Keadilan Rakyat to contest the Seri Setia state seat in Selangor for the 2008 Malaysian general election. On polling day, Nik Nazmi won by a majority of 2,863 votes, defeating the incumbent Seripah Noli Syed Hussin who had won an 11,141 vote majority in the previous election. Nik Nazmi was the youngest candidate to contest a seat in the 2008 election.

State Assemblyman 
He was the political secretary to the Menteri Besar of Selangor Abdul Khalid Ibrahim from March 2008 to June 2010.

Nik Nazmi was appointed as Communications Director of PKR in August 2010.

In the 2013 Malaysian general election Nik Nazmi defended his Seri Setia state seat. He defeated Abdul Halim Samad of Barisan Nasional with a majority of 4,663 votes.

He was then elected as Deputy Speaker of the Selangor State Legislative Assembly. During this time he inaugurated the Selangor Youth ADUN Program (Program ADUN Muda Selangor) that allowed students the experience of being legislators in the State Assembly.

Nik Nazmi is the first person to be charged under the Peaceful Assembly Act 2012 for failing to give police a 10 days' notice before holding the post-election Kelana Jaya Blackout 505 rally. If convicted under section 9(5) of the same Act, Nik Nazmi could be fined up to RM10,000, which could see the Seri Setia state assemblyman losing his seat. The rally is to protest against the election results and demand a free and fair election.

In a landmark judgment in April 2014 following Nik Nazmi's challenge on the constitutionality of the Act, the Court of Appeal unanimously ruled that it is unconstitutional to criminalise fundamental freedoms and acquitted Nik Nazmi.

PKR Youth Chief 
In the Parti Keadilan Rakyat party elections in 2014, he was elected as the Leader of the Youth Wing.

Nazmi was appointed as the State Executive Councillor in charge of Education, Human Capital Development, Science, Technology and Innovation in 2014.

Member of Parliament 
On 9 May 2018, Nik Nazmi moved to Contest the Setiawangsa Parliamentary Constituency and subsequently won the seat with a 14,372 majority.

In the 2018 PKR party elections, he was elected as a member of the Central Leadership Council and appointed as Chief Organising Secretary of the party. 

Four years later, he was elected as a Vice President of the PKR.

In the 15th General Election 2022 Malaysian general election, Nik Nazmi successfully retain the seat of Setiawangsa with a 12,614 vote majority.

Minister of Natural Resources, Environment and Climate Change 
Soon after the formation of the unity government led by Anwar Ibrahim, Nik Nazmi was subsequently appointed as the new Minister of Natural Resources, Environment and Climate Change.

This Ministry is a combination of two Ministries previously: the Ministry of Energy and Natural Resources as well as Ministry of Environment and Water. 

At the age of 40, he is the second youngest full cabinet member serving in Anwar Ibrahim cabinet, with the youngest member being UPKO President Ewon Benedick

The Mentari project
The Mentari project is the brainchild of Nik Nazmi. It is supposed to promote an alternative learning activity for underprivileged children living in the low-cost housing area of Desa Mentari, Petaling Jaya. Desa Mentari was chosen as a benchmark location as the children there have to endure extreme social problems, financial constraints to basic security issues and even serious family problems. The Mentari Project is active in fund raising programs.

Election results

References

External links 
 

Living people
1982 births
Kuala Lumpur politicians
Malaysian Muslims
Malaysian people of Malay descent
People's Justice Party (Malaysia) politicians
Members of the Selangor State Legislative Assembly
Selangor state executive councillors
People from Kelantan
Members of the Dewan Rakyat
People from Kuala Lumpur
Alumni of King's College London
21st-century Malaysian politicians
People from Selangor